The Ikhshids of Sogdia, or Ikhshids of Samarkand, were a series of rulers of Soghdia in Transoxiana, with their capital at Samarkand, during the pre-Islamic and early Islamic periods.

The Ikhshids of Soghdia, with their capital at Samarkand, are well attested during and after the Muslim conquest of Transoxiana. The rulers of the Principality of Farghana were also called "Ikhshids".

Ikhshids dynasty of Sogdia
Shishpir, originally ruler of Kish, conquered Samarkand in 631-642 CE and founded the Ikhshid dynasty. His rule in Samarkand followed that of the Hunnic tribes who had taken control of the city since around 437 CE. The founder Shishpir was succeeded by several generations of kings, who are recorded in Chinese chronicles and known through their coinage.

The Hunnic legacy appears in the coinage of Shishpir, as he adopted the Hunnic Y-shaped tamgha on the reverse of his coins. The symbol of the Hephthalites thus appears on the residual coinage of Samarkand, probably as a consequence of the Hephthalite control of Sogdia, and becomes prominent in Sogdian coinage until the Muslim conquest of Transoxiana.

Inscriptions found in the ruins of the Ikhshid palace at Samarkand and the legends of coins suggest that the Ikhsids called their own dynasty "Unash", i.e. "Hunnish". The paintings of the Afrasiab murals, made in the early Ikhshid period, contain an inscription mentioning King "Varkhuman Unash"

Afrasiab murals

The paintings of Afrasiab in Samarkand date back to the middle of the 7th century CE at the early stage of the Ilkhshid period, showing a reception of foreign dignitaries by Ikhshid king Varkhuman. They were probably painted circa 655 CE, as the Western Turkic Khaganate, members of which appear abundantly in the mural, was in its last days before its fall in 657 CE, and the Tang Dynasty was increasing its territory in Central Asia. On the four walls of the room of a private house, three or four countries in neighbouring Central Asia are depicted. On the northern wall China (a Chinese festival, with the Empress on a boat, and the Emperor hunting), on the Southern Wall Samarkand (i.e.; the Iranian world: a religious funerary procession in honor of the ancestors during the Nowruz festival), on the eastern wall India (as the land of the astrologers and of the pygmies, but the painting is much destroyed there).

Chinese protectorate (from 658)

The Ikhshids became nominal vassals of the Chinese Tang dynasty. The Chinese asserted their political power in Central Asia at the expense of the Western Turks, through the establishment of the Anxi Protectorate and the formal appointment of local rulers to Governor positions in the provinces established by the Chinese. As soon as 650-655 CE, Varkhuman was recognized by the Chinese as "King of Kangju" (Sogdia), and Governor, as reported by Chinese chronicles:

The Western Turks, who had been the main power for about a century in the region, disintegrated following the Tang Conquest of the Western Turks and the demise of their ruler Ashina Helu in 658 CE, becoming vassals of the Chinese thereafter. The Tang Dynasty would establish more or less nominal Protectorates and military garrisons throughout the area, but this control only lasted for a few years. By 662 rebellions broke out throughout the area, and the Western Turks were able to reestablish preeminence, with the Tangs only retaining sporadic and indirect control.

During this period, the Ikhshids and other Central Asian polities repeatedly requested Chinese military aid, especially against Muslim conquests, but these requests were generally met with empty promises, as the Chinese army, led by general Gao Xianzhi, was busy with the war against Tibet.

Epilogue
The line survived into Abbasid times, although by then its seat was in Istikhan.

Ghurak
Among the most notable and energetic of the Soghdian kings was Ghurak, who in 710 overthrew his predecessor Tarkhun and for almost thirty years, through shifting alliances, managed to preserve a precarious autonomy between the expanding Umayyad Caliphate and the Türgesh khaganate.

In 718, Ghurak is known to have sent an embassy to the China court, asking for support against the Arabs, but military help was denied, probably because of the huge cost and distances involved:

In retaliation, the Arab governor may have appointed Divashtich, the ruler of nearby Panjikent, as ruler of Samarkand in order to replace Ghurak. Some of the coinage of Samarkand may have been issued by Divashtich, and may correspond to this period. The power of the Arabs in the region continued to increase, as they defeated the rebellion of Divastich in 722 CE.

Turgar
The reign of the last Ikhshid ruler Turgar seems to have enjoyed a relative period of prosperity, under the rather benevolent supervision of the Muslim Umayyad Governor Nasr ibn Sayyar. This continued until the revolt of Abu Muslim and the establishment of the Abbasid Caliphate in 750 CE, after which Sogdians had to convert to Islam.

Turgar sent an embassy to China in 750 CE, probably asking for support. Hopes of Chinese support for the Ikhshids soon evaporated, with their strategic defeat against the Arabs at the Battle of Talas and the dissolution of the Anxi Protectorate in 751 CE. With the domestic An Lushan Rebellion in 755 CE, the Chinese had to removed all of their remaining forces from Central Asia, depriving the Ikhshids of any kind of diplomatic support against the Arabs.

Turgar was probably deposed circa 755-757 CE, and stopped minting coinage. Coins of Arabo-Sogdian style were now being minted in Samarkand in the name of the Governor of Khurasan Abu Dawud Khalid ibn Ibrahim. The only Sogdian resistance now took the form of internal social or religious rebellions, within the framework of the Muslim Caliphate.

Ikhshids of Sogdia

Coinage
The Ikhshids issues mostly copper coins on the Chinese model (Kaiyuan Tongbao type, round with a central square hole), with legends in Aramaic and Sogdian giving the name and title of the ruler. The Aramaic legend uses the title MLKA "King", the Sogdian legend uses the title xšēδ (Ikhshid, "Ruler"). The Ikhshids also issued a few silver coin on the Sasanian model, with face of the ruler on the obverse, and fire altar on the reverse. The Hunnic Y-shaped tamgha of the Hephthalites appears on the reverse of these coins. The second symbol (to the right) is the triskelion, symbol of Kish, from where Shishpir, the founder of the Ikhshids, originated.

Other uses of the title "Ikhshid"
The Arab authors report that the title was also used by the ruler of Ferghana during the same period: Ibn al-Athir reports that it was the ikhshid of Ferghana who called upon the Chinese for aid against the Arabs, resulting in the Battle of Talas.

The title's prestige in Central Asia remained high as late as the 10th century, when it was adopted by the Turkic commander and ruler of Egypt Muhammad ibn Tughj, whose grandfather had come from Ferghana. After his title the short-lived dynasty founded by Muhammad al-Ikhshid is known as the Ikhshidid dynasty.

References

Sources 
 
 
 
 

Sogdian words and phrases
Royal titles
History of Samarkand